Kafue Gorge Lower Power Station (KGL), is a  hydroelectric power station under construction in Zambia.

Location
The power station is located along the Kafue River, between the Kafue Gorge Upper Power Station upstream and the confluence of the Kafue River with the Zambezi River downstream. The geographical coordinates of Kafue Gorge Lower Power Station are:15°53'46.0"S, 28°33'33.0"E (Latitude:-15.896111; Longitude:28.559167).

Overview
As of 2017, according to USAID, Zambia had installed generating capacity of 2,800 megawatts. Of these, 2,380 megawatts (85 percent) was hydroelectricity. Peak electricity demand in Zambia has been recorded at 1,960 megawatts, with growth in electricity demand estimated at between 150 MW and 200 MW every year. Approximately 70 percent of national electricity output is consumed by the country's mines in the Copperbelt Province.

In October 2015, after the requisite feasibility and environmental studies, the engineering, procurement and construction contract was awarded to Sinohydro, the Chinese, state-owned hydropower engineering and construction company. The contract price is reported as US$2 billion, with 85 percent borrowed from the Exim Bank of China, and the Industrial and Commercial Bank of China. The government of Zambia will invest 15 percent into the project, using their own money.

Construction
Construction of the power station began in November 2015. As of July 2019, the contractor expected to conclude during the fourth quarter of 2020. During construction, over 3,000 jobs were created. In September 2019, construction of the dam and power station were halted due to financial difficulties.

In July 2021, one of the five turbines (Turbine Number 2) was commercially commissioned to supply 150 megawatts to the Zambian national grid.

Funding
The below table summarizes the funding sources for the power station alone, without the related power line, road and other infrastructure.

Operations

See also

List of power stations in Zambia

References

External links
 Construction of hydro power station at Kafue Gorge suspended As of 11 September 2019.
 Feasibility Study of the Kafue Gorge Lower Hydroelectric Project As at 18 August 2010.

Power stations in Zambia
Chikankata District
Hydroelectric power stations in Zambia